The referendum of 13 April 1910 approved an amendment to the Australian constitution. The referendum was for practical purposes a vote on the Constitution Alteration (State Debts) Bill 1909, which after being approved in the referendum received the Royal Assent on 6 August 1910.

Upon the establishment of the Commonwealth of Australia, the federal government was given the power to assume any pre-existing debts held by the state governments at that time. The Act altered Section 105 of the Constitution to extend this power so that the Commonwealth could take over any debts incurred by a state at any time. On the same day the referendum was held on the state debts amendment, a proposed surplus revenue amendment was also put to the electorate but was defeated.

The referendums were held on the same day as the 1910 federal election, which Alfred Deakin's Commonwealth Liberal Party lost to Andrew Fisher's Labour Party, with Fisher being sworn in as Prime Minister on 29 April.

Overview
Ensuring the future financial good health of the states was a matter of great importance to the writers of the constitution, and they worked hard to produce a workable Finance and Trade chapter (Chapter IV). Two important provisions of the chapter were Section 87, which required the return of surplus tariff funds to the states, and Section 105, which provided for the Commonwealth to take over state debts that existed at the time of Federation. By the end of the Commonwealth's first decade it was clear that Chapter IV had serious flaws, and in 1910 attempts were made to amend Sections 87 and 105.

In mid-1909, Alfred Deakin succeeded Andrew Fisher as Prime Minister for what would be his third and final time. Impetus had built in recent years for changes to state-federal financial relations, and Deakin made several important administrative decisions on this matter. Negotiations between Deakin, Forrest and state premiers produced the financial agreement of 1909, which gave the states per capita grants of 25 shillings annually. Deakin proposed two constitutional amendments at the 1910 ballot to ratify these administrative changes, though the second question was much more pressing than the first. It failed, but in practice the agreement set Commonwealth-State financial relations until 1927. The first question on the state debts proposal dealt with a perceived need to expand the operation of Section 105 to allow the Commonwealth to take over state debts whenever they were incurred.

The state debts amendment was carried by a 'yes' vote of approximately 55 per cent, with only New South Wales in opposition. According to a historian of the Loan Council, this indicated that the nation had "decisively favoured a scheme on the basis of s. 105 to relieve the States of some of their financial burden". Despite the smooth passage of the amendment, it was more than a decade before the specifically endowed powers were used. The state debts amendment was important in giving greater potential flexibility to Chapter IV of the constitution, and became an important aspect of federal-state intergovernmental financial relations.

Referendum results
Question: Do you approve of the proposed law for the alteration of the Constitution entitled 'Constitution Alteration (State Debts) 1909?

Changes to the text of the constitution

Deletion from Section 105 (removed text stricken):

The Parliament may take over from the States their public debts as existing at the establishment of the Commonwealth, or a proportion thereof according to the respective numbers of their people as shown by the latest statistics of the Commonwealth, and may convert, renew, or consolidate such debts, or any part thereof; and the States shall indemnify the Commonwealth in respect of the debts taken over, and thereafter the interest payable in respect of the debts shall be deducted and retained from the portions of the surplus revenue of the Commonwealth payable to the several States, or if such surplus is insufficient, or if there is no surplus, then the deficiency or the whole amount shall be paid by the several States.

See also
Politics of Australia
History of Australia

References

Further reading
 Standing Committee on Legislative and Constitutional Affairs (1997) Constitutional Change: Select sources on Constitutional change in Australia 1901–1997. Australian Government Printing Service, Canberra.
 Bennett, Scott (2003). Research Paper no. 11 2002–03: The Politics of Constitutional Amendment Australian Department of the Parliamentary Library, Canberra.
 Australian Electoral Commission (2007) Referendum Dates and Results 1906 – Present AEC, Canberra.
 

|-
! colspan="3" style="border-top: 5px solid #cccccc" | Amendments to the Constitution of Australia
|-
| style="width: 30%; text-align: center;" | 1st amendmentSenate Elections amendment (1907)

| style="width: 30%; text-align: center;" | 3rd amendment2nd State Debts amendment (1928)

1910 in Australia
Amendments to the Constitution of Australia
1910 referendums
Constitutional referendums in Australia